George Mitchell, nicknamed The Penguin, is an Irish criminal originally from Ballyfermot.

He had an older brother Patrick, who died in January 2020.

He is a cousin of Gay Mitchell and Jim Mitchell.

Criminal history

Early criminal history
He started as a driver for Jacob's but got involved in robberies with associates of Martin Cahill.

Illicit drug dealing
In 1988 he was convicted of stealing a large amount of cattle drench and jailed for five years. While in prison he became interested in the illegal drug trade and within a few years of his release he was the largest supplier of illicit drugs in the country.

In the 1990s he was arrested in Luton by British police while in the possession of £575,000, a downpayment for drugs. The money was seized but Mitchell was released. During this time he built up a large ecstasy processing plant.
In 1996 his associate Johnny Doran was caught with £500,000 worth of cannabis at M50 at Castleknock. His gunman Michael Boyle was caught after a botched murder attempt in London, leaving him feeling vulnerable. Concerned that the Gardaí were focusing on him, he moved the centre of his operations to Amsterdam.

Encrypted phone business
In 2015 Mitchell approached Herman-Johan Xennt about setting up an encrypted phone business. Mitchell had known Xennt since at least 1998, when Mitchell was arrested for handling stolen computer parts. (Xennt has been accused of buying stolen computer parts from Mitchell.)

Links to Hutch and Kinahan gangs
He has had links with the gangs led by Christy Kinahan and Gerry Hutch but after the Regency Hotel attack he made it clear to the Kinahan gang that he did not want to be dragged into their feud.

Exclu network
In February 2023 German police announced that he was one of five major suspects behind the Exclu network.

References

People from Ballyfermot
Year of birth missing (living people)
Irish drug traffickers
Irish gangsters
Living people
Criminals from Dublin (city)